Persea julianae is a species of plant in the family Lauraceae. It is endemic to Suriname.

References

Flora of Suriname
julianae
Vulnerable plants
Taxonomy articles created by Polbot